The 1957 All-Big Ten Conference football team consists of American football players chosen by the Associated Press (AP) and the United Press (UP) as the best players at their positions during the 1957 Big Ten Conference football season. The UP team was selected by the Big Ten head coaches.

The 1957 Ohio State Buckeyes football team, under head coach Woody Hayes, won the conference championship and placed three players on the first team: halfback Don Clark (AP-1, UP-1); guard Aurealius Thomas (AP-1, UP-1); and end Leo Brown (AP-1, UP-2). Thomas was also selected as a first-team All-American by the AP and American Football Coaches Association.

The 1957 Michigan State Spartans football team, under head coach Duffy Daugherty, finished in second place and placed six players on the first team: quarterback Jim Ninowski (AP-1, UP-1); halfback Walt Kowalczyk (AP-1, UP-1); center Dan Currie (AP-1, UP-1); tackle Pat Burke (AP-1, UP-1); end Sam Williams (AP-2, UP-1); and guard Ellison Kelly (UP-1). Kowaczyk and Currie were also consensus All-Americans.

The 1957 Iowa Hawkeyes football team, under head coach Forest Evashevski, finished third and placed three players on the first team: tackle Alex Karras (AP-1, UP-1); end Jim Gibbons (AP-1, UP-1); and guard Frank Bloomquist (AP-1, UP-2). Karras was also a consensus All-American.

All-Big Ten selections

Backs
 Jim Ninowski, Michigan State (AP-1 [qb]; UP-1)
 Jim Pace, Michigan (AP-1 [hb]; UP-1)
 Don Clark, Ohio State (AP-1 [hb]; UP-1)
 Walt Kowalczyk, Michigan State (AP-1 [hb]; UP-1)
 Dan Lewis, Wisconsin (AP-2, UP-2)
 Frank Kremblas, Ohio State (AP-2, UP-3)
 Ray Nitschke, Illinois (AP-3, UP-2)
 Randy Duncan, Iowa (UP-2)
 Bob White, Ohio State (UP-2)
 Blanche Martin, Michigan State (AP-3, UP-3)
 Jim Van Pelt, Michigan (AP-3)
 Collins Hagler, Iowa (AP-3)
 Bob Mitchell, Illinois (UP-3)
 Bob Blakely, Minnesota (UP-3)

Ends
 Jim Gibbons, Iowa (AP-1; UP-1)
 Leo Brown, Ohio State (AP-1, UP-2)
 Sam Williams, Michigan State (AP-2, UP-1)
 Dave Kaiser, Michigan State (AP-2, UP-2)
 Robert Mitchell, Illinois (AP-2)
 Robert White, Ohio State (AP-2)
 Rod Hanson, Illinois (AP-3, AP-2)
 Tom Franckhauser, Purdue (UP-3)
 Earl Hill, Wisconsin (AP-3)

Tackles
 Alex Karras, Iowa (AP-1; UP-1)
 Pat Burke, Michigan State (AP-1; UP-1)
 Dick Klein, Iowa (AP-2, UP-2)
 Nick Mumley, Purdue (AP-2)
 Jim Marshall, Ohio State (AP-3, UP-2)
 Frank Youso, Minnesota (AP-3, UP-3)
 Francis O'Brien, Michigan State (UP-3)

Guards
 Aurealius Thomas, Ohio State (AP-1; UP-1)
 Frank Bloomquist, Iowa (AP-1, UP-2)
 Ellison Kelly, Michigan State (UP-1)
 David Burkholder, Minnesota (AP-2, UP-2)
 Robert Commings, Iowa (AP-2)
 John Jardine, Purdue (AP-3)
 Bill Burrell, Illinois (AP-3)
 Ron Sabal, Purdue (UP-3)
 Bill Gehler, Wisconsin (UP-3)

Centers
 Dan Currie, Michigan State (AP-1; UP-1)
 Neil Habig, Purdue (AP-2, UP-2)
 Dick Teteak, Wisconsin (AP-3, UP-3)

Key
AP = Associated Press, selected in a poll of AP writers

UP = United Press, selected by the conference coaches

Bold = one of the nine players chosen as a first-team selection by both the AP and UP

See also
1957 College Football All-America Team

References

All-Big Ten Conference
All-Big Ten Conference football teams